CNIM is a French equipment manufacturer and industrial contractor operating on a worldwide basis. The group supplies products and services to major public and private sector organisations, local authorities and national governments in the environment, energy, defence, and high technology markets. Founded in 1856, CNIM is a medium-sized company. CNIM is listed on the Euronext exchange in Paris. It relies on a stable family-based majority shareholding structure committed to its development. The group is headed by Nicolas Dmitrieff, chairman of the management board.

The company is also a manufacturer of escalators and moving walks since 1968 primarily for metros and airports, including elevators since 2009 but not very often compared to their escalators and moving walks productions.

Management board
As at May 2018

Nicolas Dmitrieff, chairman of the management board
Stanislas Ancel, chief executive, Environment & Energy Sector, president of SUNCNIM
Philippe Demigné, chief executive, Innovation & Systems Sector, president of Bertin Technologies and its subsidiaries
Christophe Favrelle, chief financial officer

Supervisory board
As at May 2018
Christiane Dmitrieff, chairman of the supervisory board
François Canellas, vice-chairman
Lucile Dmitrieff, member
Sophie Dmitrieff, member
Sigrid Duhamel, independent member
Société FREL represented by Agnès Herlicq
André Herlicq, member
Stéphane Herlicq, member
Louis-Roch Burgard, independent member
Johannes Martin, member
Société MARTIN represented by Ulrich Martin
Alain Sonnette, member

References

External links

Engineering companies of France
Escalator manufacturers